Karvelas was an Australian television commentary program broadcast weekly on Sky News Australia. The program, airing Sundays at 7pm AEST/AEDT and broadcast from Melbourne, was hosted by Patricia Karvelas. The series premiered on 7 February 2016. First announced in December 2015, the program covers political and national affairs.

The program ended in 2017, with Karvelas defecting to ABC News to host National Wrap on the public broadcaster in 2018.

References

External links
Sky News Official site

Sky News Australia
Australian non-fiction television series
English-language television shows
2016 Australian television series debuts
2017 Australian television series endings